Diego Orlando Auzqui (born October 19, 1989, in Buenos Aires, Argentina) is an Argentine footballer currently playing for F.C. Motagua in the Honduran Liga Nacional.

Teams
  Estudiantes de La Plata 2009–2012
  Nueva Chicago 2012–2013
  San Luis de Quillota 2013–2021

Titles
  Estudiantes de La Plata 2009 (Copa Libertadores de América), 2010 (Torneo Apertura Primera División Argentina Championship)

External links
 Profile at BDFA 
 

1989 births
Living people
Argentine footballers
Argentine expatriate footballers
Estudiantes de La Plata footballers
San Luis de Quillota footballers
Nueva Chicago footballers
F.C. Motagua players
Primera B de Chile players
Argentine Primera División players
Liga Nacional de Fútbol Profesional de Honduras players
Expatriate footballers in Chile
Footballers from Buenos Aires
Association football midfielders